Michael McGrath (born 7 April 1936) is an Irish former professional footballer who played as a left half.

McGrath began his career with Dublin club Home Farm before moving to England to join Blackburn Rovers in August 1954. He made 269 Football League appearances over the next ten years at Ewood Park. and played with players including Peter Dobing, Derek Dougan and Mike England. He helped the club win promotion to the First Division and appeared in the 1960 FA Cup Final where he scored an own goal in a 3–0 defeat to Wolves.

In March 1966 he signed for Bradford Park Avenue where he made 50 league appearances before becoming player manager at Bangor City F.C. He also played 22 times for the Republic of Ireland national team and made one appearance for the Republic of Ireland B team in 1957.

He later lived in Blackburn and retired after 24 years working for Thwaites Brewery.

References

External links
 

1936 births
Living people
Association footballers from Dublin (city)
Republic of Ireland association footballers
Association football midfielders
Republic of Ireland international footballers
Republic of Ireland B international footballers
Home Farm F.C. players
Blackburn Rovers F.C. players
English Football League players
Republic of Ireland football managers
Bangor City F.C. managers
Bradford (Park Avenue) A.F.C. players
Bangor City F.C. players
FA Cup Final players